Guizhou Normal University (GZNU) is a provincial research university in the historic "summer capital of China" in Guiyang, Guizhou province. It was established in 1941 as one of the original eight normal schools (teacher-training institutions) in China.

With a total enrollment of over 36,000 full-time students, Guizhou Normal University grants undergraduate, graduate, and doctoral degrees through 24 colleges and departments. The university also educates working professionals and adults through a college of continuing education.

History

The university was founded in 1941 as National Guiyang Normal College. After the formation of the People's Republic of China in 1949 it was renamed Guiyang Normal College, then in 1985 it became Guizhou Normal University and in 1996 it was accredited as a provincial key university in Guizhou.

In 2004, the former Guizhou Vocational Institute of Technology merged into the university.

See also
 List of universities in China

References

External links
 Official website of Guizhou Normal University
 Guizhou Normal University Official website

Teachers colleges in China
Universities and colleges in Guizhou
Education in Guizhou
Educational institutions established in 1941
1941 establishments in China